Li Wenqing (16 May 1930 – 14 June 2009) was a general in the People's Liberation Army of China who served as political commissar of the PLA National Defence University from 1992 to 1995.

He was a member of the 14th Central Committee of the Chinese Communist Party. He was a delegate to the 6th and 7th National People's Congress. He was a member of the Standing Committee of the 9th Chinese People's Political Consultative Conference.

Biography
Li was born Li Yunxiu in Muping County (now Muping District of Yantai), Shandong, on 16 May 1930. He joined the Chinese Communist Party (CCP) in April 1947, and enlisted in the People's Liberation Army (PLA) in January 1948. 

During the Chinese Civil War, Li served in the war and engaged in the Yanzhou campaign, Huaihai campaign, Yangtze River Crossing campaign, and Shanghai Campaign. In 1951, he was assigned to the 60th Army of the People's Volunteer Army and fight in the Chinese spring offensive, in which he witnessed the disastrous defeat of the 180th Division.

In 1955, Li was reassigned to the Nanjing Military Region, and before long he became a secretary for Commander Xu Shiyou. He was eventually promoted to deputy director of the Office of the Headquarters of the Nanjing Military Region in 1967. In 1973, he was transferred to the 60th Group Army, in which he received a promotion to political commissar in 1983. After the abolition of the 60th Group Army in June 1985, he was made director of the Political Department of the Shenyang Military Region, and was promoted to deputy political commissar in August 1988. He served as deputy political commissar of the PLA National Defence University in April 1990, and was promoted to political commissar position in October 1992. 

He was promoted to the rank of lieutenant general (zhongjiang) in 1988 and general (shangjiang) in 1994. 

On 14 June 2009, Li died from an illness in Beijing, at the age of 79.

Work

References

1930 births
2009 deaths
People from Yantai
People's Liberation Army generals from Shandong
People's Republic of China politicians from Shandong
Chinese Communist Party politicians from Shandong
Members of the 14th Central Committee of the Chinese Communist Party
Delegates to the 6th National People's Congress
Delegates to the 7th National People's Congress
Members of the Standing Committee of the 9th Chinese People's Political Consultative Conference